JMC Heavy Duty Vehicle (JMCH) is a Chinese trucks manufacturer owned by Volvo Trucks. 

It was established in 2013 by Jiangling Motors as a successor of Taiyuan Changan and is headquartered in Taiyuan.

History
In August 2012, Jiangling Motors announced it would acquire all the stake of the Taiyuan-based heavy truck manufacturer Taiyuan Changan Heavy Truck Company from its shareholders Changan (80% stake) and China South Industries Group Corporation (20%). Taiyuan Changan Heavy Truck had been established in 2007 and planned to sell about 15,000 trucks by 2012 and be in the level of the top-ten truck manufacturers within China, but the actual number that year was about 3,000. Taiyuan Changan Heavy Truck was reincorporated as JMC Heavy Duty Vehicle (JMCH) and restarted operations on 8 January 2013. In July 2014, Ford and JMCH signed an agreement for the latter to produce Ford-based heavy trucks. In 2015, JMCH completed the construction of a new assembly plant and an engine plant. The first product from the company, the Cargo-based Weilong, was unveiled at the 2017 Shanghai Motor Show and deliveries started in October 2017. In 2018, the company introduced the F-MAX-based Weilong HV5.

In August 2020, following constant yearly losses, JMC announced it had spun off JMCH's engine branch into a separate company called Taiyuan Jiangling Power Co., Ltd. In October 2020, it announced it had put a 60% controlling stake from the new company on sale. In January 2021, it announced it had sold the stake to the Yunnei Group (a state-owned holding controlled by the Kunming State-owned Assets Supervision and Administration Commission).
 That same month, JMC said it would increase the JMCH capital with the aim of improving its assets-liabilities ratio and facilitating a company restructuring. In May 2021, JMC said its board had decided to list JMCH for sale.

Volvo plans to launch production of its truck models FH, FM and FMX for Chinese market in acquired plant by the end of 2022.

Products
The company sells two Ford-based heavy trucks, the Weilong and Weilong HV5, under various configurations.
 Weilong (based on Ford Cargo)
 Weilong HV5 (based on Ford F-MAX)

The Weilong range will be discontinued in 2022 in favour of new Volvo Trucks FH, FM and FMX models.

References

External links
 

Truck manufacturers of China
Companies based in Taiyuan
Vehicle manufacturing companies established in 2013
Ford Motor Company